Bård Borgersen (born 20 May 1972) is a Norwegian former footballer who played as a defender, most notable for his time with Odd Grenland and Start. Borgersen was capped 10 times and scored two goals for Norway.

Club career
Borgersen started his career at hometown side Start before moving to Adeccoligaen team Bryne. After four seasons he signed for fellow second division team Odd Grenland with whom he clinched the 1998 title and promotion to the Tippeligaen. He moved to Denmark in 2001 but returned after four seasons to finally rejoin Start.

From 2009 he is a playing assistant coach of Start. He retired after the 2011 season.

International career
He made his debut in an October 2001 World Cup qualifying match against Armenia. He immediately made an impact, as he scored a first goal only 3 minutes after coming on as a second-half substitute for Ronny Johnsen and a second 10 minutes from full-time. He has collected 10 caps in total, playing his last international match in March 2006 against Senegal.

Career statistics

Honours
 Kniksen Award as defender of the year 2005

References

External links

1972 births
Living people
Sportspeople from Kristiansand
Norwegian footballers
Norway international footballers
Bryne FK players
Odds BK players
AaB Fodbold players
IK Start players
Kniksen Award winners
Norwegian expatriate footballers
Expatriate men's footballers in Denmark
Norwegian expatriate sportspeople in Denmark
Association football defenders
Norwegian football managers
IK Start managers
Eliteserien managers